Men's single skating was contested between 17 and 19 February 1994. 25 skaters from 17 nations participated.

Results

Note: In the short program, Gheorghe and Min tied for 16th, while Vlascenko and Oikawa tied for 21st

Referees

 Sally-Anne Stapleford
 Berit Aarnes (assistant referee)

Judges
 Nicolae Bellu
 Alexander Lakernik 
 Alexei Shirshov
 Hisashi Yoshikawa
 Monique Georgelin
 Linda Petersen
 Ronald T. Pfenning 
 Robert Worsfold
 Elizabeth Clark
 Vera Spurná (substitute)

References

M
1994 in figure skating
Men's events at the 1994 Winter Olympics